Gentleman Jim is a studio album by Jim Reeves, released in 1963 on RCA Victor.

Track listing

Charts

References 

1963 albums
Albums produced by Chet Atkins
Albums produced by Anita Kerr
Jim Reeves albums
RCA Victor albums